Benton Harbor Area Schools is a school district in Benton Harbor, Michigan, United States. 
The public school district serves the city of Benton Harbor and surrounding areas. The school district has one high school, two elementary schools, and one middle school.

History
Until the consolidation done in the mid-1960s certain out-lying areas, such as Fair Plain, had their own independent school districts.

In 2007, the district hired a new superintendent. Carole Schmidt replaced Dr. Paula Dawning. The hiring of Schmidt was notable because she left her job as superintendent of the St. Joseph Public School District. Schmidt is the first white superintendent of the Benton Harbor School District in decades.

As of November, 2011.  Benton Harbor Area Schools superintendent is Dr. Leonard Seawood. In an article in the Herald Palladium dated November 23, 2011, "State schools Superintendent Michael Flanagan said in a Nov. 15 letter to Benton Harbor Superintendent Leonard Seawood the [financial]review is needed because of serious concerns about the district's financial viability. Among those concerns are the district's $18 million deficit, its distressed cash flow and the fact it has missed two payments to its employees retirement service and can't come to an agreement with its employees about a contract."  Dr. Seawood said that, "Changes, consolidations and cuts have to be made to avoid a state takeover under Public Act 4, the emergency manager law - the same law that governing Benton Harbor's emergency manager."

The school board governs the school district. The current president is Anthony Jett. Board members are:  Martha Momany, Barbara Bell, Sharon James, Lue Buchana, Joseph Taylor and Henry Booker.

Schools
Benton Harbor High School
Dream Academy
Arts & Communications Academy at Fair Plain
S.T.E.A.M Academy at MLK
Hull International Academy 
Discovery Enrichment Center

References

External links

Education in Berrien County, Michigan
School districts in Michigan
Benton Harbor, Michigan